The seventh The Desert Sessions LP, titled Volume 7: Gypsy Marches, was released in 2001, packaged along with Volume 8: Can You See Under My Thumb? There You Are. in a gatefold 10" album format. The song "Hanging Tree" was later released on the Queens of the Stone Age album Songs for the Deaf.

This is the first release on Josh Homme's record label, Rekords Rekords.

Track listing 

2001 albums
07
Southern Lord Records albums